The following military, mission-affiliated, public, private and royal cemeteries are located in Accra, Ghana:

References 

Accra
Accra
Ghana-related lists
Accra